This article lists the confirmed national futsal squads for the 2000 FIFA Futsal World Championship tournament held in Guatemala, between November 18 and December 3, 2000.

Group A

Team coach:  Fernando Ferretti

Team coach:  Vander Iacovino

Team coach:  Kassymzhan Madjyev

Team coach:  Orlando Duarte

Group B

Team coach:  Emad Hag

Team coach:  César Robido

Team coach:  Sílvio Pinheiro

Team coach:  Nico Spreij

Group C

Team coach:  Mikhail Bondarev

Team coach:  James Roberts

Team coach:  Carlos Quiros Alvarez

Team coach:  Marijan Brnčić

Group D

Team coach:  Hossein Shams

Team coach:  Clemente Reinoso

Team coach:  Javier Lozano

Team coach:  Fernando Larrañaga

References

External links
 Official website
 Official Report

S
FIFA Futsal World Cup squads